Oenopides of Chios (born c. 490 BCE) was an ancient Greek geometer and astronomer, who lived around 450 BCE.

Biography 
Only limited information are known about the early life of Oenopides except his birthplace which was the island of Chios around 490 BCE. It is believed that Oenopides spent time in Athens but there is only circumstantial evidence to support this. Plato mentions him in Erastae: A Dialogue On Philosophy which places him in Athens. The English translator of the same book reveals (in footnote 3) one other aspect in Oenopides life which was his travel in Egypt in which he enriched his knowledge in the art of Astronomy and Geometry by some Egyptian priests.

Astronomy 
The main accomplishment of Oenopides as an astronomer was his determination of the angle between the plane of the celestial equator, and the zodiac (the yearly path of the Sun in the sky). He found this angle to be 24°. In effect this amounted to measuring the inclination of the Earth axis. Oenopides's result remained the standard value for two centuries, until Eratosthenes measured it with greater precision.

Oenopides also determined the value of the Great Year, that is, the shortest interval of time that is equal to both an integer number of years and an integer number of months. As the relative positions of the Sun and Moon repeat themselves after each Great Year, this offers a means to predict solar and lunar eclipses. In actual practice this is only approximately true, because the ratio of the length of the year and that of the month does not exactly match any simple mathematical fraction, and because in addition the lunar orbit varies continuously.

Oenopides put the Great Year at 59 years, corresponding to 730 months. This was a good approximation, but not a perfect one, since 59 (sidereal) years are equal to 21550.1 days, while 730 (synodical) months equal 21557.3 days. The difference therefore amounts to seven days. In addition there are the interfering variations in the lunar orbit. However, a 59-year period had the advantage that it corresponded quite closely to an integer number of orbital revolutions of several planets around the Sun, which meant that their relative positions also repeated each Great Year cycle. Before Oenopides a Great Year of eight solar years was in use (= 99 months). Shortly after Oenopides, in 432 BC, Meton and Euctemon discovered the better value of 18 years, equal to 223 months (the so-called Saros period).

Geometry

Distinction of theorems and problems
While Oenopides's innovations as an astronomer mainly concern practical issues, as a geometer he seems to have been rather a theorist and methodologist, who set himself the task to make geometry comply with higher standards of theoretical purity. Thus he introduced the distinction between 'theorems' and 'problems': though both are involved with the solution of an exercise, a theorem is meant to be a theoretical building block to be used as the fundament of further theory, while a problem is only an isolated exercise without further follow-up or importance.

Compass and straightedge
Oenopides apparently also was the author of the rule that geometrical constructions should use no other means than compass and straightedge. In this context his name adheres to two specific elementary constructions of plane geometry: first, to draw from a given point a straight line perpendicular to a given straight line; and second, on a given straight line and at a given point on it, to construct a rectilineal angle equal to a given rectilineal angle.

Miscellaneous opinions attributed to Oenopides 
Several more opinions in various areas are attributed to Oenopides:

He is said to have given an explanation of the flooding of the Nile each summer. On the basis of observations of the temperature of water in deep wells he seems erroneously to have inferred that underground water is in fact cooler in summer than in winter. In winter, when rain fell and seeped into the ground it would soon evaporate again because of the heat in the soil. However, in summer, when water in the ground was supposedly colder, there would be less evaporation. The surplus of moisture would then have to be carried off otherwise, thereby causing the Nile to overflow.
 To Oenopides was attributed the opinion that formerly the Sun had moved along the Milky Way. However, when it saw how Thyestes, a mythological figure, was served his own son for dinner by his brother Atreus, the Sun was so horrified that it left its course and moved to the zodiac instead.
 Oenopides was said to have regarded the universe as a living organism, God or the Divine being its soul.
 He is also said to have considered air and fire as being the first principles of the universe.

Notes

References 
 István M. Bodnár, Oenopides of Chius: A survey of the modern literature with a collection of the ancient testimonia, Berlin 2007, preprint 327 of the Max Planck Institute for the History of Science, accessible at http://www.mpiwg-berlin.mpg.de/Preprints/P327.PDF
 Ivor Bulmer-Thomas, 'Oenopides of Chios', in: Dictionary of Scientific Biography, Charles Coulston Gillispie, ed. (18 volumes; New York 1970-1990) volume 10 pp. 179–182.
 Kurt von Fritz, 'Oinopides', in: Paulys Realencyclopädie der Classischen Altertumswissenschaft, G. Wissowa, ed. (51 volumes; 1894–1980) volume 17 (1937) columns 2258-2272 (in German).

490s BC births
5th-century BC Greek people
Ancient Greek astronomers
Ancient Greek geometers
Year of death unknown
Ancient Chians
5th-century BC mathematicians